William Kavanaugh Oldham (May 20, 1865 – May 6, 1938) was the Acting Governor of the U.S. state of Arkansas for six days in 1913.

Oldham was born in Richmond, Kentucky and educated at Central University, also in Richmond. He moved to Pettus, Arkansas in Lonoke County in 1885 and became a successful cotton farmer.

He was elected to the Arkansas House of Representatives in 1907. He served as a member of the Arkansas Senate from 1911 to 1913, and was selected as president of the Senate in 1913.

When Governor Joseph Taylor Robinson resigned from office on March 8, 1913, Oldham became acting governor of Arkansas. When the legislative session ended on March 13, the Arkansas Senate elected Junius Marion Futrell as the new president pro tempore, but Oldham refused to agree that Futrell was the new acting governor; the dispute was settled by the Arkansas Supreme Court on March 24, in favor of Futrell.

Oldham retired from public service and returned to farming. He later served as chairman of the state Cotton Reduction Committee.

William K. Oldham died in Pettus, Arkansas and is buried at the Oakland & Fraternal Historic Cemetery Park in Little Rock, Arkansas.

Family
Oldham was the brother-in-law of James Philip Eagle (1837–1904), governor of Arkansas 1889–1893, who married Oldham's sister Mary Kavanaugh Oldham in 1882. William K. Oldham's younger brother Kie Oldham (1869–1916) served as James Eagle's private secretary while he was governor, gathered an important collection of documents about Arkansas' Civil War history, and was a prominent lawyer, working primarily as an advocate for Indian tribes. Kie also served in the Arkansas state senate, in 1907 and 1908–9; in 1907 Kie and William were both in the legislature, representing the same county as representative and senator.

Oldham married Lillian Munroe (1870–1957) in 1894; they had two children, William Kavanaugh Oldham (1896–1950) and Lillian Oldham (b. circa 1898).

References

1865 births
1938 deaths
Acting Governors of Arkansas
Democratic Party Arkansas state senators
Democratic Party governors of Arkansas
Democratic Party members of the Arkansas House of Representatives
People from Richmond, Kentucky